William Day (1529 – 20 September 1596) was an English clergyman, Provost of Eton College for many years, and at the end of his life Bishop of Winchester.

Life
He was born the son of Richard Day & Elizabeth Osborne of Shropshire and educated at Eton College and King's College, Cambridge, where he was Fellow in 1548, and graduated MA, in 1553. He became Provost of Eton College in 1561, his predecessor Richard Bruerne being ejected; it was a position he held until 1595.

He was created Archdeacon of Nottingham in 1561 and canon of St George's Chapel, Windsor in 1563, before being appointed Dean of the Chapel Royal and Dean of Windsor in 1572. He was registrar of the Order of the Garter, from 1584, and chancellor of St Paul's Cathedral, from 1587. He was raised to the episcopy as Bishop of Winchester in 1595.

He died in 1596.

Family
Bishop William Day 1st married Elizabeth Barlow, daughter of Bishop William Barlow. Bishop William Day married 2nd after 1571 Ann Duffield daughter of Robert Duffield who also married a 2nd Cousin of Queen Ann Boleyn named William Bullen or Boleyn
Issue from first marriage:
Rachel Day who married Robert Barker who was son of Christopher Barker mentioned as both "Royal Printer to the Queen"
William Day Jun. of Bray Berkshire married Ellen Wentworth daughter of Paul Wentworth & Helen Awsha of Burnham Buckinghamshire (his uncle, John Day married Elizabeth Wentworth of South Elmsell Yorkshire)
Richard Day
Thomas Day
Susan Day who married a Cox (may well have been a son of Dr Cox Bishop)
Elizabeth Day
Alice Day married Thomas Ridley (Dr of Civil Laws) a relative of Bishop Nicholas Ridley

Francis Day of Madras was possibly a grandson, son of his son William Day of Bray.

George Day, Bishop of Chichester, was his brother.

References

1529 births
1596 deaths
People educated at Eton College
Alumni of King's College, Cambridge
Fellows of King's College, Cambridge
Archdeacons of Nottingham
Canons of Windsor
Deans of Windsor
Deans of the Chapel Royal
Bishops of Winchester
16th-century Church of England bishops
Registrars of the Order of the Garter
Chancellors of St Paul's Cathedral
Provosts of Eton College